Wapley is a rural village in South Gloucestershire, England.

See also
 Do not stand at my grave and weep

References

External links

Villages in South Gloucestershire District